Baima Subdistrict is a subdistrict in Yijiang District, Wuhu, Anhui, China. , it administers Shiwei Residential Community and the following eight villages:
Baima Village
Taying Village
Yixing Village
Xinyi Village
Xindahan Village
Paifang Village
Qingzhu Village
Xinshan Village

See also 
 List of township-level divisions of Anhui

References 

Township-level divisions of Anhui
Wuhu